Qusha Qeshlaq may refer to:
Qusha Qeshlaq-e Khasai
Qusha Qeshlaq-e Mansur va Rahman
Qusha Qeshlaq-e Qambai
Qusha Qeshlaq-e Rezali Beyg